Batavia's Graveyard: The True Story of the Mad Heretic Who Led History's Bloodiest Mutiny is a book released in 2001 by Welsh author Mike Dash about the Dutch East India Company ship , shipwrecked in 1629 on a small atoll of the Houtman Abrolhos, off the western shore of Australia.

Description 
The book retells the story of one of the largest mutinies in history, led by one of the ship's officers, Jeronimus Cornelisz, who oversaw the massacre of at least 110 people. The book explores the background of the period in history, and many of the people involved in the Dutch Republic. It casts a light on the tortuous trip from the Dutch Republic to the Dutch East Indies, and provides a detailed account of events after the captain and some of the crew's departure for Batavia in an open boat. 

The final chapter highlights the survivors' fates and the rediscovery of the wreck.

See also 
 List of works about the Dutch East India Company

References

1629 in Australia
2002 non-fiction books
Batavia (1628 ship)
History books about the Dutch Empire
Houtman Abrolhos
Weidenfeld & Nicolson books
Works about the Dutch East India Company